Saphenista saragurae is a species of moth of the family Tortricidae. It is found in Loja Province, Ecuador.

The wingspan is about 16.5 mm. The ground colour of the forewings is cream white, sprinkled with brown and with yellow-brown and brown suffusions. The hindwings are brownish, but become whitish towards the base.

Etymology
The species name refers to the type locality, Saraguro.

References

Moths described in 2008
Saphenista